Laurel Ridge may refer to:

Laurel Hill (Pennsylvania), also known as Laurel Ridge or Laurel Mountain, a mountain in Pennsylvania
Laurel Ridge State Park, in Pennsylvania
Laurel Ridge (plantation), in Iberville Parish, Louisiana